Lodovico Campalastro was an Italian painter, born and active in Ferrara, where he painted  a Nativity, a Repose in Egypt, and an Adoration of the Magi for the church of San Crispin, while for the church of San Lorenzo, he painted a St. Francis of Assisi.

References

17th-century Italian painters
Italian male painters
Painters from Ferrara
Year of birth missing
Year of death missing